Galloway Forest Park is a forest park operated by Forestry and Land Scotland, principally covering woodland in Dumfries and Galloway. It is claimed to be the largest forest in the UK. The park was granted Dark Sky Park status ("Galloway Forest Dark Sky Park") in November 2009, being the first area in the UK to be so designated.

The three visitor centres at Glen Trool, Kirroughtree, and Clatteringshaws receive around 150,000 each year. Much of the Galloway Hills lie within the boundaries of the park and there is good but rough hillwalking and also some rock climbing and ice-climbing within the park. Within or near the boundaries of the park are several well developed mountain bike tracks, forming part of the 7stanes project.

As well as catering for recreation, the park includes economically valuable woodland, producing 500,000 tons of timber per year.

Galloway Forest Park and the people who visit it and work in it were the subject of a six-part BBC One documentary series aired in early 2018 entitled "The Forest".

Dark sky 
In November 2009 the International Dark-Sky Association conferred Dark Sky Park status on the Galloway Forest Park, the first area in the UK to be so designated.

The Scottish Dark Sky Observatory, near Dalmellington, is located within the northern edge of the Galloway Forest Dark Sky Park. The observatory was partly funded by the Scottish Government and opened in 2012. It suffered a devastating fire during the early hours of 23 June 2021, resulting in complete destruction of the observatory. The fire is currently being treated as suspicious.

Alexander Murray
The park is also home to the ruins of the birthplace of Alexander Murray, the son of a shepherd and farm labourer. Murray was self-taught on multiple languages, and eventually went on to become professor of Oriental languages at University of Edinburgh. A short distance away, high on a hillside, is Murray's Monument, which was erected in his memory in 1835.

Typhoon crash
On 18 March 1944, 22-year-old Canadian pilot Kenneth Mitchell crashed his Hawker Typhoon aircraft in the forest (location here). The impact killed him instantly. Mitchell was in training in preparation for his squadron's role fighting the German V-1 flying bombs in the Second World War. On 18 March 2009, 65 years to the day since the crash, a commemorative plaque was installed on a mortared cairn at the crash site, where pieces of the aircraft still remain. Mitchell was buried in Ayr Cemetery, Ayr.

See also
Loch Macaterick

References

External links
 Recreation at Galloway Forest Park at the Forestry and Land Scotland website
 'Activity Tourism' from the Countryside Recreation Network
 Information on Hill Walking in the Galloway Hills 
 Rock and Ice climbing in the Galloway Hills
 7 Stanes
 7 Stanes - Galloway Forest Park

Forests and woodlands of Scotland
Country parks in Scotland
Dark-sky preserves in the United Kingdom
Parks in Dumfries and Galloway
Forest parks of Scotland